was a petting zoo for cats located on the eighth floor of the Ikebukuro Tokyu Hands store.

Nekobukuro is a play on the Japanese word for cat, "neko", and the location Ikebukuro.

It was one of the better known cat-petting destinations, being included in tourist and sightseeing guides.

For an entrance fee, customers could interact and play with any of the fifteen to twenty cats currently running free around Nekobukuro at the time. Over 30 cats were rostered in and out over the course of the day to ensure they are not over-handled.

Like Tokyo's many cat cafés, Nekobukuro is viewed as an alternative to pet ownership while still maintaining pet interaction. Not only is buying and keeping a pet in Japan expensive, many apartments will not allow pets, and some Tokyo residents feel their work schedule may not be compatible with the ownership of an animal.

Nekobukuro had no attached cafe and did not permit food or drink, but a couples discount and no time limit ensured its continued popularity as a destination on dates.

Nekobukuro closed on September 10, 2021.

List of cat breeds at Nekobukuro
A large variety of cats are kept, including the following breeds:
 Norwegian Forest Cat
 Maine Coon
 Siamese
 Russian Blue
 Scottish Fold
 Persian

References

External links 
 Official Website 

Retail companies of Japan
Tokyu Group
Tourist attractions in Tokyo
Ikebukuro